Walter T. Mosley, III (born September 19, 1967) is an American politician who represented the 57th district of the New York State Assembly. He serves the neighborhoods of Fort Greene, Clinton Hill, Prospect Heights, and parts of Crown Heights and Bedford-Stuyvesant. In 2020, Mosley lost his primary to nurse and political newcomer Phara Souffrant Forrest.

Early life and education
Mosley was born in Brooklyn, New York. His mother is Marilyn Mosley, the president of Progressive Association for Political Action (PAPA) and chief of staff to the Speaker of the House Corey Johnson. His father is Walter T. Mosley, Sr., a retired insurance broker who currently lives in Ohio.

He attended Pennsylvania State University, where he obtained his Bachelor degree in Criminology. He received his J.D. degree from Howard University in 1998.

Earlier career
Mosley served as a district leader, senior adviser to the Deputy Speaker of New York State Assembly and chief of staff and senior consultant to the New York State Assembly before running to for Assembly.

New York State Assembly
Mosley ran to fill Hakeem Jeffries's Assembly seat in the 57th district in 2012 when Jeffries ran for Congress. Mosley won the Democratic primary with 62.8% of the vote, beating out Olanike T. Alabi and Martine Guerrier. He handily defeated Republican challenger Francis J. Voyticky, who Hakeem Jeffries had beaten in 2010, in the general election with 97.6% of the vote. Mosley ran unopposed in 2014, 2016, and 2018, running on both the Democratic and Working Families Party lines in 2016 and 2018.

East Ramapo School District bill
He was originally a co-sponsor of a bill to place a monitor with veto power in the East Ramapo School District in Rockland County, an Orthodox Jewish-dominated school district that was diverting funds to yeshivas. Mosley took his name off after meeting with both sides, saying that the discussion about the bill has anti-Semitic overtones. He refused to meet with the sponsor of the bill, a 71-year-old former East Ramapo schoolteacher, and ultimately did not vote on the bill.

2020 Democratic primary defeat
Mosley faced his first primary challenger since 2012 in the Democratic primary on June 23, 2020 against Phara Souffrant Forrest. While Mosley led Forrest by 588 votes on election night, absentee ballots were more significant than usual due to the COVID-19 pandemic. On July 22, 2020, once absentee ballots had been counted, Forrest was declared the winner of the primary by over 2,500 votes.

Electoral history

References

External links
 Official website

1967 births
Living people
Politicians from Brooklyn
Working Families Party politicians
Democratic Party members of the New York State Assembly
21st-century American politicians
African-American state legislators in New York (state)
Howard University School of Law alumni
Pennsylvania State University alumni
American people of Bahamian descent
21st-century African-American politicians
20th-century African-American people